Taraz (also Romanized as Tārāz; also known as Tārāz-e Hayāt Qolī) is a village in Jastun Shah Rural District, Hati District, Lali County, Khuzestan Province, Iran. At the 2006 census, its population was 424, in 77 families.

References 

Populated places in Lali County